Sharon is a New England town in Norfolk County, Massachusetts, United States. The population was 18,575 at the 2020 census.

History

The Town of Sharon was first settled as part of the Massachusetts Bay Colony in 1637 and was deemed the 2nd precinct of Stoughton in 1740. It was established as the district of Stoughtonham on June 21, 1765, incorporated as the Town of Stoughtonham on August 23, 1775, and was named Sharon on February 25, 1783, after Israel's Sharon plain, due to its high level of forestation. Several towns in New England were given this name. Part of Stoughtonham went to the new town of Foxborough on June 10, 1776. During the American Revolution, the townspeople of Sharon made cannonballs and cannons for the Continental Army at a local foundry.

In front of the Sharon Public Library stands a statue of Deborah Sampson, Sharon's town heroine. Sampson disguised herself as a man to fight in the Revolutionary War. After the war, she married Benjamin Gannett, a farmer and lived in Sharon until the end of her life. Sampson began a campaign in 1790 to secure a pension from her time in the Revolutionary War, which earned the support of well known public figures, including Paul Revere. In 1804, Revere visited Sampson (then Sampson Gannett) at her farm in Sharon and wrote to the congressman of her district, William Eustis, that he found her "much more deserving than hundreds to whom Congress have been generous." Sampson was placed on the United States pension list a year later, and awarded an annual payment. She is buried in the local Rock Ridge Cemetery. A street in Sharon is named Deborah Sampson Street in her honor. In 1983, the Massachusetts General Court designated Sampson as the official State Heroine of the Commonwealth of Massachusetts.

The Unitarian and Congregational churches in the center of Sharon both have church bells manufactured by Paul Revere.

The recipient of letters from across the United States in Stanley Milgram's small-world experiment lived in Sharon.

Sharon is the former home of the Kendall Whaling Museum, founded by Henry P. Kendall in 1955. In 2001, the museum was merged with the New Bedford Whaling Museum, and its collection is now part of that museum, though the archives of the museum are still held in Sharon.

In Sharon there are six historical properties or districts that are registered with the state. Of the six, five are listed
on the National Register and three are certified local historic districts:

In 1970, Sharon's First Historic District becomes an LHD. This is the area on North Main Street from Post
Office Square to School Street and includes the Library and the Unitarian and Congregational Churches. It
becomes a National Register District in 1975. In 1974 Cobb's Tavern becomes a National Historic Landmark. Located at 41 Bay Road, it becomes
Sharon's Second Historic District in 1991. In 1980, Stoneholm, located at 188 Ames Street, becomes a National Historic Landmark. In 1984, the Stoughtonham Furnace Site (partially in Foxborough) becomes a National Historic Landmark. In 1997, Borderland State Park (partially in Easton) becomes a National Register District. In 2004, Sharon's Third Historic District was approved by Town Meeting and accepted by the Commonwealth.
This includes the Charles R. Wilber School, the Pleasant Street School, and the Kate Morrell Park.

Geography
According to the United States Census Bureau, the town has a total area of 24.2 square miles (62.6 km), of which, 23.3 square miles (60.4 km) is land and 0.9 square miles (2.2 km) (3.56%) is water. This includes Lake Massapoag, which is one of the town's most prominent features and a popular recreational site for swimming and boating. It was largely responsible for the town's early development as a summer resort location. Sharon is drained by the Canoe River to the south, and Massapoag Brook to the north.

Climate

Sharon is located in a continental climate, like most of New England and most of the Northeastern and Midwestern United States. It is cooler than coastal New England locations because it is inland. The town has warm to hot summers and cold winters. It is often humid in the summer. Sharon receives about 50 inches of precipitation every year on average. According to the Köppen Climate Classification system, Sharon has a humid continental climate, abbreviated "Dfb" on climate maps.

Adjacent towns
Sharon is located in eastern Massachusetts, bordered by the following towns:
 Canton to the northeast
 Norwood to the north
 Walpole to the northwest
 Foxborough to the west
 Stoughton to the east
 Easton to the southeast
 Mansfield a small portion to the southeast

Demographics

As of the census of 2010, there were 17,612 people, 6,219 households and 5,039 families residing in the town.

As of 2010, the racial makeup of the town was 82.3% White, 4.2% African American, 0.1% Native American, 10.9% Asian, 0.01% Pacific Islander, 0.6% from other races and 1.8% from two or more races. Hispanic or Latino of any race were 2.1% of the population. According to the American Community Survey administered in 2014, the racial makeup of the town was 76.0% White, 4.2% African American, 0.1% Native American, 16.6% Asian, 0.0% Pacific Islander, 0.4% from other races and 2.7% from two or more races, with Hispanic or Latino of any race at 2.5% of the population.

22.5% of the population speaks a language other than English at home, and 19.2% of the population was born outside of the United States. Sharon has the state's highest proportion of Russian immigrants, estimated at 14.4% in 2010.

Of the 6,219 households, 42.4% had children under the age of 18 living with them, 70.7% were married couples living together, 7.7% had a female householder with no husband present, 2.6% had a male householder with no wife present, and 19.0% were non-families.  16.1% of all households were made up of individuals, and 7.5% had someone living alone who was 65 years of age or older. The average household size was 2.82 people and the average family size was 3.17 people.

The population was spread out, with 27.3% under the age of 18, 5.3% from 18 to 24, 20.0% from 25 to 44, 34.7% from 45 to 64 and 12.7% who were 65 years of age or older. The median age was 43.3 years. For every 100 females, there were 93.2 males.  For every 100 females age 18 and over, there were 90.6 males.

As of 2014, the median income for a household in the town was $127,413 and the median income for a family was $144,167.  Males had a median income of $100,951 versus $72,917 for females. The per capita income for the town was $56,465. About 1.1% of families and 2.7% of the population were below the poverty line, including 3.0% of those under age 18 and 3.9% of those age 65 or over.

According to the 2014 American Community Survey, 97.6% of adults in Sharon are high school graduates, and 72.8% have a bachelor's degree or higher. Of those 25 and older, 11.3% have completed some college but do not have a degree, 4.7% have an associate degree, 34.7% have a bachelor's degree, and 37.7% have a graduate or professional degree.

Sharon is home to 7 synagogues, 9 churches, and one of the largest mosques in New England, the Islamic Center of New England.

Parks and recreation
Sharon has a large number of scenic trails due to the high percentage of conservation land within the town's borders. Trails found in Sharon include the Massapoag Trail, the Warner Trail, the Bay Circuit Trail (known as the Beaver Brook Trail in Sharon), and the King Philip's Rock Trail. There are a number of trails at Borderland State Park and at Moose Hill Wildlife Sanctuary.

Government
Sharon currently has an Open Town Meeting form of government, with three Selectmen. In 2008, a commission was elected to prepare a charter document specifying the executive, legislative, and administrative structure of town government. It considered whether the town should retain its current government form or change to a representative form. There was a debate, whether the town has outgrown Open Town Meeting, where decisions are made only by those attending (who must be present to vote) or whether direct-vote government works well because residents who choose to attend are particularly interested in and informed on the issues. In November 2009, the charter commission recommended a "hybrid" legislative branch consisting of a Legislative Committee (Representative Town Meeting of 17 members) and an Open Town Meeting (which could be called to review the Legislative Committee's decisions if 3% of voters signed a "review petition"). At a town election on May 18, 2010, the charter proposal was rejected by a vote of 1123 yes, 2305 no.

As of February 2016, there are 12,383 registered voters in Sharon. 4,050 (32.7%) are enrolled as Democrats, 968 (7.8%) are enrolled as Republicans, 7,330 (59.2%) do not belong to a party, and 12 belong to other parties.

Sharon has continued to trend Democratic. In the 2012 presidential election, Barack Obama carried Sharon with 63% of the vote, while Mitt Romney received 35%. The same year, Democrat Elizabeth Warren won Sharon with 57% of the vote, defeating incumbent Republican senator Scott Brown, who received 43% of the vote in the town. In the 2016 presidential election, Hillary Clinton won 68.6% of the vote, and Donald Trump won 23.2%. In the 2020 presidential election, Joe Biden won 75.1% and Donald Trump won 22.3%.

Sharon is in Massachusetts' 4th congressional district, and is currently represented in the U.S. House of Representatives by Jake Auchincloss and in the U.S. Senate by Elizabeth Warren and Ed Markey.

Education

The Sharon Public Schools system has five schools.  Grades K–5 attend one of the three elementary schools: Cottage Street School, East Elementary School, or Heights Elementary School. Grades 6–8 attend Sharon Middle School, and grades 9–12 attend Sharon High School. The middle school and high school sports teams are known as the Eagles.  The school system is noted for its outstanding academic performance and learning curriculum. Sharon Public Schools GPA is on a 6.33 scale. Sharon Middle School (SMS) and Sharon High School (SHS) both have athletic fields including baseball, football, soccer fields, tennis courts, as well as a track. In 2011, Sharon High School was awarded the National Blue Ribbon Schools award by the U.S. Department of Education. It was one of two schools in Massachusetts to receive the award. In the 2013–2014 school year, the AP participation rate at Sharon High School was 87%, and the participant passing rate was 99%.

The Charles R. Wilber School served as Sharon's high school until 1957, after which it became an intermediate school. In 2009 a new wing was added to the building, and it was converted to residential use.

In 2020, construction of a new high school building commenced and is scheduled for completion around the 2022–2023 school year. The old building, which is now well over sixty years old, will be demolished. The new building is being funded through taxpayers and a grant from the Massachusetts State.

Infrastructure

Transportation
Commuter rail service from Boston's South Station is provided by the MBTA with a stop in Sharon on its Providence/Stoughton Line.  There are no public bus or subway lines in Sharon.

Exit 8 of Interstate 95 is on the Sharon/Foxborough border, with access to both the northbound and southbound directions of the highway.  Exit 10 of Interstate 95 is on the Sharon/Walpole line, with access to the northbound direction of the highway and from the southbound direction. Exit 9 of Interstate 95 is also in Sharon, located on Route 1. This exit allows North or Southbound access to I95.

In addition, Massachusetts Route 27 runs through the center of the town and leads to Route 1.

Notable people

 Mildred Allen, physicist
 Tully Banta-Cain, NFL player
 Leonard Bernstein (1918-1990), composer (summer resident)
 John Brebbia (born 1990), MLB pitcher 
 Etan Cohen, Israeli-American screenwriter
 Sarah Palfrey Cooke, US tennis champion
 Joseph A. Cushman, micropaleontologist, foraminiferologist
 Arthur Vining Davis, industrialist and philanthropist
 Jake Fishman (born 1995), American-Israeli MLB and Team Israel baseball player
 Tommy Harper, baseball player
 Amasa Hewins, portrait, genre and landscape painter
 Roland James, football defensive back
 Myron Kaufmann, novelist
 Bill Keating, congressman
 Henry Way Kendall, physicist, Nobel laureate
 Aryeh Klapper, rabbi
 Ty Law, football cornerback
 Jack Levin, sociologist
 Evan Marshall, literary agent, novelist
 John McLaughlin, artist
 Bruce Pearl (born 1960), basketball coach
 Ted Philips, Massachusetts politician
 Frank Salemme, Italian/Irish mobster and former boss of Patriarca crime family
 Deborah Sampson, Revolutionary era heroine
 Stephen Schneider, actor
 Pete Seibert, ski resort founder
 Scott A. Shikora, surgeon
 Andre Tippett (born 1959), NFL football linebacker (Hall of Fame)
 Charles Q. Tirrell, congressman
 Terrence Wheatley, football cornerback
 Nick Zinner, guitarist

In popular culture
In Jhumpa Lahiri's Unaccustomed Earth, Hema's family in the story "Once in a Lifetime" lives in Sharon.
Daytime footage for Shutter Island was taken in Borderland State Park, a property shared with the neighboring town of Easton.
The 1973 film The Friends of Eddie Coyle, starring Robert Mitchum, includes a scene filmed in Sharon.

See also
 Sharon Historic District

References

External links

 
1650 establishments in Massachusetts
Populated places established in 1650
Towns in Massachusetts
Towns in Norfolk County, Massachusetts